The Cathedral of Saint John the Evangelist or La Cathédrale St-Jean, originally called l'Église St-Jean du Vermilion, is the cathedral and mother church of the Roman Catholic Diocese of Lafayette in Louisiana. It was the first parish in Lafayette Parish—founded in 1821—and was designated cathedral upon the erection of the diocese in 1918.

The historic church—located at 515 Cathedral Street in downtown Lafayette—is the third structure built on the site. The land was donated in 1821 by Jean Mouton, a wealthy planter who had founded the town as Vermilionville. The cornerstone was laid in 1913, and the church was completed in 1916 in the Dutch Romanesque Revival style. A large red and white brick structure, its notable features include stained glass produced in Munich depicting the life of the patron, oil paintings of Christ and the Apostles, and a Casavant Frères organ.

St. John's Cemetery is the oldest in the city of Lafayette. Notable burials include Jean Mouton, who donated the property for the church; his son Alexandre Mouton, a U.S. senator and governor of Louisiana; his grandson Alfred Mouton, a Confederate general in the American Civil War; and Jefferson Caffery, a distinguished U.S. diplomat who was a Lafayette native.

The church and a  area comprising the Bishop's residence and the cemetery was listed on the National Register of Historic Places on July 27, 1979.

See also
National Register of Historic Places listings in Lafayette Parish, Louisiana
List of Catholic cathedrals in the United States
List of cathedrals in the United States

References

External links

 Official Cathedral Site
 Roman Catholic Diocese of Lafayette in Louisiana Official Site

Religious organizations established in 1821
Roman Catholic churches completed in 1916
Romanesque Revival church buildings in Louisiana
Culture of Lafayette, Louisiana
John
Churches on the National Register of Historic Places in Louisiana
Museums in Lafayette Parish, Louisiana
Religious museums in Louisiana
Churches in Lafayette, Louisiana
1821 establishments in Louisiana
National Register of Historic Places in Lafayette Parish, Louisiana
20th-century Roman Catholic church buildings in the United States